Vacanze in America (Holidays in America) is a 1984 Italian comedy film directed by Carlo Vanzina.

Plot summary 
Summer. In a high school in Rome, Don Buro, priest and religion teacher, leads a class of young people in a school holiday in the United States. Among the guys there is the repeating Peo, who decides to entertain the boys in his own way, including roulette bets and beautiful girls with whom to have sex. However Peo doesn't realize that Don Buro, to ensure peace, has brought in another companion: Mrs. De Romanis, mother of one of the boys.

Cast 
Jerry Calà: Peo Colombo
Christian De Sica: Don Buro
Claudio Amendola: Alessio Liberatore
Antonella Interlenghi: Antonella
Edwige Fenech: Miss De Romanis
Gianmarco Tognazzi: Filippo De Romanis 
Fabio Ferrari: Furio Quintiliani
 Enzo Liberti: Alessio's Father

See also   
 List of Italian films of 1984

References

External links

1984 films
Italian comedy films
1984 comedy films
Films directed by Carlo Vanzina
Films scored by Manuel De Sica
Films set in the United States
1980s Italian-language films
1980s Italian films